Joseph Tice Gellibrand (1792 – 1837) was the first Attorney-General of the British colony of Van Diemen's Land where he gained notoriety with his attempts to establish full rights of trial by jury. He became an integral part of the Port Phillip Association, producing the Batman Treaty in an attempt to obtain extensive land-holdings from the local Aboriginal people around Port Phillip. He was also later part of an ill-fated expedition into the region west of Geelong where he disappeared and was assumed to have been killed by Aboriginal people in the Otway Range.

Early life
Joseph Tice Gellibrand was born in England, the second son of William Gellibrand and Sophia Louisa, née Hynde. He studied law, was called to the bar, and on 1 August 1823 was appointed Attorney-General of Van Diemen's Land with a salary of £700 a year, with the right "to practise as a barrister under the same restrictions as are observed in this country".

Attorney-General of Van Diemen's Land
Gellibrand arrived at Hobart accompanied by his father on 15 March 1824, and at the opening of the Supreme Court gave an address as leader of the bar, in which he spoke of trial by jury "as one of the greatest boons conferred by the legislature upon this colony". The full benefit of trial by jury had, however, been withheld from the colony, and Gellibrand's speech is held by some to have been the opening of a campaign for an unconditional system. Gellibrand was a believer in the liberty of the subject, and he was consequently bound to fall foul of a man with the autocratic tendencies of Governor George Arthur.

At the beginning of 1825 Robert William Lathrop Murray, editor of the Hobart Town Gazette, began criticising the colonial government in his paper. Arthur believed that Gellibrand was acting in "close union" with Murray. Eventually Gellibrand was charged with unprofessional conduct in having, as a barrister, drawn the pleas for the plaintiff in a case, and afterwards as Attorney-General, acted against him. As a consequence of the charge Alfred Stephen the Solicitor-General applied to have Gellibrand struck off the rolls.

As a result, Gellibrand lost his position and began practising as a barrister. He established a high reputation in Hobart. In 1830 he acted for Roderic O'Connor in a case brought by sheriff Dudley Fereday, who was also a moneylender. Fereday accused O'Connor of libel after O'Connor had publicly attacked his business practices. Gellibrand gave "a detailed account of Fereday as the prince of usurers, lending money at 35 per cent interest". Fereday won damages of £400, but his reputation was severely damaged by Gellibrand's speeches.

In 1828 Gellibrand made some efforts to obtain a government appointment at Sydney without success. In 1835 Gellibrand made an attempt to obtain a revision of his case, and counsel's opinion on it was obtained from Serjeant Talfourd. His opinion was "that the charges have been grounded in mistake or malice, pursued with entire inattention to the rights of the accused, and decided in prejudice and anger. The charges respecting professional practice are too absurd to stand for a moment".

Port Phillip Association
As early as January 1827, Gellibrand in partnership with John Batman applied for a grant of land in the as yet un-colonised region at Port Phillip. They stated that they were prepared to bring with them sheep and cattle to the value of £4000 to £5000. This application was refused, but the two colonists maintained their interest in the pursuit of obtaining land at Port Phillip.

In 1835 Gellibrand became one of the leading members of the Port Phillip Association, a company of 17 colonists who devised a plan to obtain and divide amongst themselves thousands of acres of land on the northern shore of Port Phillip through a treaty with the local Wurundjeri people. Gellibrand, having a strong foundation in law, drew up this Batman Treaty which stipulated that the Aboriginal people would hand over all of the land within 10 miles of the northern shore in exchange for a yearly hand-out of basic provisions. Gellibrand was assigned a block of land that is now the region that extends from Laverton to Spotswood.

Gellibrand with several other members of the Association crossed Bass Strait from Van Diemen's Land in January 1836 in a vessel loaded with sheep to be pastured on their newly obtained land. They came ashore at Western Port, and following native pathways that took them through vacant Aboriginal villages, they made their way across the Mornington Peninsula to Port Phillip. Supplying themselves with water from wells dug by Aboriginal people, they walked along the shore to the vicinity of the Melbourne settlement on the Yarra River. Gellibrand could barely walk by this stage, and was taken the remaining distance in boat manned by Aborigines from Sydney who were working for John Batman.

On 4 February, he travelled to the Geelong region, guided by William Buckley, an ex-convict who had lived with the local Wathaurong people for over thirty years. He assessed the land there, finding that the Aboriginal people were being driven away by a property manager who threatened to shoot them for stealing potatoes. He then proceeded back to the Yarra River and conducted an exploration up this river to the north-east where he named the Plenty River. When he returned to Melbourne he conducted an informal inquiry into the abduction and rape of an Aboriginal woman by a shepherd, which resulted in some protection being given to the victim.

Despite Gellibrand's efforts, the Batman Treaty was deemed invalid and overruled by Governor Richard Bourke in 1836. The lands purchased by the Association were judged to be owned by the Crown and not by the members of the Port Phillip Association nor by the Aborigines. The Port Phillip Association members however, were recompensed £7,000 from the colonial government. Gellibrand subsequently returned to Van Diemen's Land.

Exploration and disappearance to the west of Port Phillip
Gellibrand, in company with George B. L. Hesse, again crossed to Port Phillip and landed near Geelong on 21 February 1837. They decided to explore the un-colonised land to the west and planned to follow the Barwon River to its junction with the Leigh River, and afterwards make their way back to Melbourne across country mostly unknown to the British. The two men set out with a guide but managed to miss the junction with the Leigh River and continued up the Barwon. Their guide became fearful of continuing and returned, while Gellibrand and Hesse decided to travel further west alone. They failed to arrive at Melbourne and a search party consisting of five prominent Geelong pastoralists including Frederick Armytage and Thomas Roadknight was immediately organised. This group followed their tracks but lost all sign of them in a forest that existed between what is now Winchelsea and Birregurra. The search party then turned north and became the first Britishers to view Lake Colac before returning to Geelong. Another search party, led by Gellibrand's son, set out on 31 March 1837 but again lost sight of the tracks within the same forest as the previous group.

In April, a larger group of 14 men funded by Gellibrand's wife, was organised after information was obtained from local Aborigines that the two missing men had been killed by Gulidjan people near Lake Colac. Several Wathaurong men of the Barrabool clan around Geelong led the group to Lake Colac where they found horse-tracks leading to a community beside the lake. The Barrabool men then captured and forced a Gulidjan man by the name of Tanapia into a confession before killing him along with a woman they had also caught. Deeming that the situation had become dangerous for their safety, the search party decided to return to Geelong. The group's report that they had solved the mystery and exacted justice was strongly discredited as no bodies nor any personal artefacts of Gellibrand or Hesse were recovered. It was argued that the Barrabool men had only led the search party to Lake Colac so as to take violence upon a tribe they had animosity with and to obtain the reward offered.

Over a year later, with the disappearance unresolved, another two expeditions were organised. In June 1838, surveyor H.W.H Smythe was guided by an Aboriginal man named Jack through the Colac region. After reaching Djerrinallum, Jack admitted he had no knowledge of the country further to the west and Smythe resolved to shoot Jack if he showed signs of abandoning him. Symthe returned unsuccessful in obtaining any information about Gellibrand. In July, Alexander McGeary led another search party after information was given that two white men were living with an Aboriginal clan towards the western regions. McGeary also failed to find any sign of Gellibrand but managed to come into conflict with an Aboriginal stranger during his journey, who clubbed McGeary on the head and jaw. His life was saved after two Aboriginal men he employed as guards shot the stranger dead.

Discovery of remains near Cape Otway
In 1844 George Allan, a pioneer pastoralist of the Warrnambool region, learnt that Gadubanud people from the Otway Range had seven years ago encountered two white men fitting the description of Gellibrand and Hesse. They claimed that Gellibrand walked into their camp seeking assistance and although they were able to help Gellibrand, Hesse had already died of starvation. Gellibrand apparently lived with them for two months before he was strangled to death by members of a nearby clan, his body buried and mourned over by the people who had tried to help him.

Allan with his brother and several Aboriginal guides set out to find the buried remains. They encountered the Gadubanud clan who directed them to the burial site near a river they called Barratt. Allan unearthed the skeleton, taking the skull which was later examined and considered with little doubt to be that of Gellibrand. Allan renamed the Barratt as the Gellibrand River in honour of the man whose remains he considered to have found. In 1846, the Gadubanud who remained near Cape Otway were exterminated by a militia of Barrabool men organised by Captain Foster Fyans.

Legacy
Gellibrand married and was survived by at least three sons, one of whom, Walter Angus Gellibrand, was a member of the Tasmanian Legislative Council from 1871 to 1893, and was its president from 1884 to 1889. Another son, Thomas Lloyd Gellibrand, became the father of Major General Sir John Gellibrand, K.C.B., D.S.O., who was born in 1872. His youngest daughter, Mary Selina (1837–1903), played an important part in the Tasmanian Society for the Prevention of Cruelty to Animals.

The Australian electoral Division of Gellibrand, Mount Gellibrand, Point Gellibrand, the township of Gellibrand, Gellibrand St (Queenscliff), and the Gellibrand River are named after him.

See also
 List of people who disappeared

References

Books
P. C. James, 'Gellibrand, Joseph Tice (1792? - 1837)', Australian Dictionary of Biography, Volume 1, Melbourne University Press, 1966, pp 437–438. Retrieved 1 November 2008
Museum Victoria, Encounters: A History of Aboriginal People in Victoria, J. T. Gellibrand.

1792 births
1830s missing person cases
1837 deaths
19th-century Australian politicians
Attorneys-General of Tasmania
19th-century Australian lawyers
Date of birth unknown
Date of death unknown
History of Victoria (Australia)
Missing person cases in Australia